Adam DeVine's House Party is an American comedy television series starring Adam DeVine that is part stand-up comedy show and part sitcom. The show aired for three seasons on Comedy Central. The first season ran for eight episodes, starting on October 24, 2013. The second season began on September 9, 2014, before moving to its regular Thursday timeslot on September 11. The third season aired for ten episodes, starting on March 3, 2016.

The premise of the show is that, in each episode, DeVine is hosting a party at which three stand-up comedians perform. At the beginning and end of the show, as well as between sets, there are scripted scenes involving DeVine and, usually, the three comedians, revolving around some plot related to the party. Only the first season truly involved a house party. The first season was set at, and filmed in, a house in Los Angeles; the second season was set at and filmed in a bar in New Orleans; and the third season was set at and filmed at the Turtle Bay Resort in Oahu, Hawaii.

In the first season, there was a recurring joke in which some or many of the partygoers leave early to attend a party at comedian Jeff Ross's house, to which DeVine was never invited.

Production
The show was a longtime idea of DeVine's, based on house parties he had attended, as well as on the TV show The Larry Sanders Show, which was a hybrid of talk show and sitcom.

The show's scripted scenes were written by DeVine and Scotty Landes. Kyle Newacheck, DeVine's costar on Workaholics, is the co-creator of the show, as well as its director, and also occasionally appears onscreen as the director of the show-within-the-show.

Many of the comedians who perform are friends of DeVine's from his own stand-up comedy career.

Episodes

Season 1 (2013) 
The first season was filmed at a house in Chatsworth in Los Angeles, California that also served as Mike Tyson's house for the film The Hangover.

Season 2 (2014) 
The second season was filmed at Bamboula's, a bar in New Orleans, Louisiana.

Season 3 (2016)
Season 3 was shot entirely on location at Turtle Bay Resort in Oahu, Hawaii.

References

External links
 

2010s American late-night television series
2010s American stand-up comedy television series
2013 American television series debuts
2016 American television series endings
Comedy Central original programming
Comedy Central late-night programming
Television shows set in Los Angeles
Television shows set in New Orleans